Miss Grand Paraguay 2017 was the first edition of the Miss Grand Paraguay pageant, held on July 29, 2017, at the Agustin Pio Barrios Theater in Japanese Paraguayan Center.

The event was broadcast nationwide on La Tele and directed by Gabriel Román, Milciades Marecoand, and Myriam Arévalos,

Results

Contestants
16 contestants competed for the title of Miss Grand Paraguay 2017.

References

External links

 

Miss Grand Paraguay
Beauty pageants in Paraguay
Paraguayan awards
Grand Paraguay